Super Neptunia RPG ( 勇者ネプテューヌ世界よ宇宙よ刮目せよ！！ アルティメットＲＰＧ宣言！！) is a side-scrolling role-playing video game in the Hyperdimension Neptunia series developed by Artisan Studios, with assistance from Idea Factory and Compile Heart. It was published by Idea Factory for the PlayStation 4, Nintendo Switch, and Microsoft Windows via Steam. In the game, Neptune, Noire, Blanc, and Vert, all suffering from amnesia, oppose Bombyx Mori, a group that forces citizens to create 2D video games while forbidding other games.

Super Neptunia RPG was first released in December 2018 in Japan, and then released by Idea Factory International worldwide in June 2019. Primarily developed by a French-Canadian studio, it is the first game in the series that has been developed by a company not located in Japan.

Gameplay
In Super Neptunia RPG, the player travels a horizontal world of dungeons, cities, and more. In cities, players can buy and sell items and weapons, accept and report quests, and enter different buildings. In dungeons, monsters are roaming and treasure boxes containing items are hidden. Touching a monster begins a battle, which can be conducted with up to 4 party members. As time passes, Action Points (AP) will accumulate, and each character can use AP in order to activate their Skills. Skills have an Elemental type, and it affects the damage that enemies and allies take. Damaging enemies with the element to which they are weak will recover AP. 

The game's playable characters are Gamindustri's 4 CPUs (Neptune, Noire, Blanc, and Vert), their HDD forms (Purple Heart, Black Heart, White Heart, and Green Heart) and a new character named Chrome. Additional characters IF, Compa, and Artisan (also a new character) are playable via paid downloadable content.

Music
Opening Theme: "Dia vo Lhizer" by Eri Sasaki
Ending Theme: "Never ending true stories" by Asaka

Reception

Super Neptunia RPG received generally mixed reviews. Praise was given to its art direction and presentation, while performance and difficult platforming were cited as issues. Additional criticism was given towards Sony's decision to censor the PS4 version.

References

External links
  
  

2018 video games
Hyperdimension Neptunia games
Nintendo Switch games
PlayStation 4 games
Video games developed in Canada
Video games developed in Japan
Windows games
Censored video games
Single-player video games
Idea Factory games
Compile Heart games